DXRT (99.1 FM), broadcasting as 99.1 Wild FM, is a radio station owned and operated by UM Broadcasting Network. The station's studio is located along J. Catolico St., General Santos.

References

External links
Wild FM General Santos FB Page

Radio stations in General Santos
Radio stations established in 1964